The British International School Shanghai Puxi  is an international school in Minhang, Shanghai, China which opened in 2004.

The British International School Shanghai Puxi follows the National Curriculum of England and Wales, the International General Certificate of Secondary Education and the IB Diploma Programme at a secondary level.

History

The school was founded in 2004 and is part of the Nord Anglia Education's group of schools. Nord Anglia Education owns and operates 43 international schools around the world in Asia, Europe, the Middle East and America.

Campus and location

The school began with one campus building in 2004 and a new secondary building was opened on a nearby site in 2008. This was followed by a new secondary campus, built alongside the original school building, which was opened in 2011 by Prince Andrew, Duke of York.

The campus is located in the Puxi side of Shanghai, in the Huacao area, a expatriate residential area.

Facilities include
Classrooms for Early Years, primary and secondary students
Music technology classrooms and recording studios
Music practice rooms
Primary and secondary science laboratories
Black box drama studio 
Two theatres
Primary and Secondary Learning Resource Centres (Libraries)
2 indoor gymnasiums
Tennis courts
25-metre swimming pool in the secondary school
Smaller primary school swimming pool
Full size football pitch and athletics track turfed with astroturf
Outdoor play area

Key stages and school structure
The school follows the British Key Stage System.

Extra-curricular activities

The school offers over after-school activities across the ECA and BISCAP (British International School Community Activity Programme) programmes. The main difference between ECAs and BISCAPs is that BISCAPs are not free.

ECAs include a range of sport, dance, drama, science, gardening, exam revision, martial arts, a range of music groups and many more.

BISCAP is an additional programme which brings in external coaches to run early morning, after school, evening and weekend sessions in music, sport, art and drama.

The school is also home to China Elite Tennis Academy (CETA)  who hold training sessions on campus.

Accreditations
The British International School Shanghai Puxi is accredited to offer the IB Diploma Programme (IBDP) and the International General Certificate of Secondary Education (IGSCE).

The school is also an accredited examination centre for the ABRSM, HSK, Cambridge International Examinations Centre (CIEC),

The school is accredited the Association of China and Mongolia International Schools (ACAMIS), the Council of British International Schools (COBIS), Federation of British International Schools in Asia (FOBISIA), EdExcel Examination Board, Shanghai International Schools association (SISA)

Community

The school has a Parent Teacher Association (PTA) which organises social events during the school year including the annual Welcome Back Party, the Christmas Fair and the International Food Evening. They also have a New Parent Programme who organise events and information sessions for new families to the school.

The school's Room Parent network is a popular way for parents to get involved in school life, with one Room Parent responsible for one particular class. Room Parents provide information to the parents from the class teacher. They also help to organise volunteers needed for reading, as well as helping to arrange coffee mornings or other activities for parents to socialise and get to know one another.

References

External links
 BISS Puxi Campus
 FOBISIA
 ACAMIS
 COBIS
 Greater Hongqiao Guide

British international schools in Shanghai
International Baccalaureate schools in China
Private schools in Shanghai
Minhang District
Educational institutions established in 2004
2004 establishments in China